Ganga is a 2017 Indian Tamil-language supernatural soap opera, season-1 starring Mounica, Pradeep, Piyali, Anuradha and Yuvarani. The story is partially based on Indra Soundar Rajan's novel and remake of the Telugu language television series Saptha Mathrika which aired on Gemini TV from 2016–2017. It replaced Pasamalar and it broadcast on Sun TV on Monday to Saturday from 2 January 2017 to 7 July 2018 for 464 episodes.

The second Season of this serial starring Pradeep Bennetto Ryan, Mounica, Jayashri Chaki,kalyani, Vimal Venkatesan, Geerthana, Aravind, GK, Premi Venkat, Ajay Kapoor and Vincent Roy. The show completed its 400th episode on 24 April 2018.

Synopsis
Season 01
It is a story is spun around Ganga's curse upon the unwed maidens of the village, Kannikapuram. How will Abhirami (Piyali Munshi), the lead protagonist save the village from the curse and thereby marry the man she loves.

Season 02
Shiva and Gowri After married how do they live together?
Later, Gowri realises that Shiva loves Abirami not her. So, she decides to marry Shiva with Abirami. But, after his marriage with Abi, he loses his memory in an accident. Finally, how he accepts Abirami and lives with Gowri and Abi is the rest of story.

Cast
Main cast
 Pradeep Benetto Ryan as Shiva (Gowri and Abirami's husband) (Episode: 1 – 464) 
 Mounica as Gangamma (Episode: 1–186) / Gowri Shiva (Shiva's First Wife) (double role from Episode: 131 – 464)
 Kalyani as Abirami (Shiva's Second wife) (Episode: 220–464)
 Vimal Venkatesan as Jeyasimma (Krishna's brother and Malar's husband) (Episode: 131 – 464)
 Suju Vasan as Malar (Jeyasimma's wife) (Episode: 250 – 464)
 Ajay Kapoor as Ajay Jayaraman (AJ; Antagonist, Episode: 220–464)

Additional cast
 Geerthana as Sowmya (Abirami's sister & Krishna's wife)
 Fawaz Zayani as Krishna (Sowmya's husband)
 Premi Venkat as Dhamayandhi (Jeyasimma's mother)
 Iraa Agarwal as Mahima
 Prabhavathi
 Ravi Raj
 Vincent Roy as Ramanathan (Episode: 220–464)
 Murali Kumar as Narasimha, Bhupathi's son
 Jeevitha as ACP Swarna
 Sujatha

Former Cast 
 Piyali Munshi as Abirami (Episode: 1–186), a Goddess power and tale of Ganga, she loves Shiva, but some reason Shiva gets to married Gowri.
 L.Raja as Abirami & Sowmya's father (Episode: 1–186)
 Yuvarani as Kanaka, Shiva's mother (died in the serial) (Episode: 8-186), Shiva Mother and Gowri Aunt
 Kavitha as Rudhramma (Episode: 123–151)
 Manju Bhargavi as Alangaara Naachiyaar (Episode 1 to 43) and Anuradha as Alangaara Naachiyaar
 Navin Victor as Prabha (died in the serial, killed by) (Episode: 1–95), Shiva and Abirami colleague 
 --- (Episode: 189 – 199) and Kalyani as Malar (Episode: 200 – 249)
 Aravind as Krishna (Sowmya's husband)
 Vijakrushna Raj as Zamindar Bhupathi
 Naveen Arakkal
 GK as Narasimha, Bhupathi's son
 Ashok Kannan
 Subalakshmi Rangan as Karthika
 Nivisha

Casting
Season 1
Season 1 Series is a Supernatural Fantasy Thriller story produced by Home Movie Makers under the banner Home Movie Makers Pvt.Ltd that airs on Sun TV. Actress Piyali Munshi was selected to portray the lead role of Abirami, This is First serial in Tamil-language. Who is known for her Serial in Hindi Language likes Siya Ke Ram, Sasural Simar Ka, Santoshi Maa and Savdhaan India. Telugu Actress Mounica Makes her debut in Tamil Serial in and as Ganga. Pradeep was selected to portray the lead role of Shiva. Yuvarani who was also cast in Home Movie Makers TV Series Pasamalar was selected to portray the Main role of Shiva's mother. Manju Bhargavi was cast to portray the negative role of Alangaara Naachiyaar. Later Anuradha was replaced role of Alangaara Naachiyaar in Episode: 44. Other supporting cast include GK, Premi Venkat, Aravind, Prabhavathi, Vijakrushna Raj.

Season 2
Season 2 Series is a Family story, in this Season old actors are working with new actors. Actress Poornitha was selected to portray the new lead role of Malar. Who is known for her Serial like Annamalai, Pirivom Santhippom: Season 1, Thayumanavan and Andal Azhagar. Later Sri Padma was replaced role of Malar in Episode: 250. Other first-season cast include Pradeep Benetto Ryan, Mounica, Vimal Venkatesan, Geerthana, Aravind and Premi Venkat.

Seasons overview

Original soundtrack

Title song
It was written by lyricist Kiruthiya, composed by the music director Srikanth Deva. It was sung by Ananthu.

Soundtrack

Ratings 

Ganga attracted high viewership ratings in India during its broadcast in 2017. The New Face cast members quickly became household names. On YouTube, the official Channel of the serial "Gannga" has more subscribers as of August 2017. The channel has 50000+ – 1 million views for all the episodes combined as of August 2017.

References

External links 
 Official Website 
 Sun TV on YouTube
 Sun TV Network 
 Sun Group 
 Movie Makers on YouTube

Sun TV original programming
Tamil-language horror fiction television series
Tamil-language mystery television series
Tamil-language romance television series
Tamil-language thriller television series
2010s Tamil-language television series
2017 Tamil-language television series debuts
Tamil-language television shows
2017 Tamil-language television seasons
2018 Tamil-language television series endings
Tamil-language television series based on Telugu-language television series